Most of the tallest buildings in Kenya are found in Nairobi, the capital and largest city in the country. The tallest building in the city is the new 32-storey,  Britam Towers. The second-tallest building in the city is the 43-storey,  GTC Office Tower. The most recent skyscrapers to be constructed are Prism Tower, Le'Mac and FCB Mirhab Tower.

Nairobi's history of towers began with the IPS Building (1967), the Hilton Nairobi (1969), the NSSF Building (1973), and the Kenyatta International Conference Centre in 1974. Buildings in the city remained relatively short until the late 1960s when the city experienced its first skyscraper boom. From 1960 to 1980, Nairobi witnessed a major expansion of skyscraper and high-rise construction. Many of the city's office towers were completed during this period, such as the New Central Bank Tower. A near twenty-year lull in building construction came after this expansion, though Nairobi has experienced a smaller second building expansion beginning  in the late 1990s and continuing into the present.

As of 2015, Nairobi had 50 completed high-rise buildings, with 6 more under construction, and another 6 proposed.

Other towns in the country are starting to experience a surge in the construction of skyscrapers. For instance, the recently completed Moi University Pension Scheme Complex (Daima Tower) in Eldoret completed in 2016 stands at 89 meters featuring among the tallest in Kenya. Construction of high-rise buildings is ongoing in other regions such as Mombasa.

Buildings
This includes spires and architectural details but does not include antenna masts.

Projects
This is a list of projects over  that are topped out, under construction, approved, on-hold and proposed in the city of Nairobi.

List of on-going projects in Mombasa

See also

 List of tallest buildings in Africa
 List of tallest structures in the world by country

References

 
Kenya
Kenya
Tallest